Hullabaloo Over Georgie and Bonnie's Pictures is a 1978 film by Merchant Ivory Productions (written by Ruth Prawer Jhabvala, directed by James Ivory and produced by Ismail Merchant) set in India, starring UK stage actress Dame Peggy Ashcroft.

Plot synopsis

A group of thieves descend upon an Indian palace to steal a collection of valuable paintings. The group includes Lady Gee (Peggy Ashcroft), a museum curator; the Maharaja (Victor Banerjee), his sister Bonnie (Aparna Sen) who wants to sell the paintings to Sotheby's, and a few others.

External links
 
Merchant Ivory overview

1978 films
British Indian films
English-language Indian films
Films directed by James Ivory
Merchant Ivory Productions films
Films with screenplays by Ruth Prawer Jhabvala
1970s English-language films